is a private women's college in Kunitachi, Tokyo, Japan. The predecessor of the school was founded in 1902, and it was chartered as a junior college in 1950. In 1962 it became a four-year college.

External links
 Official website 

Educational institutions established in 1902
Private universities and colleges in Japan
Universities and colleges in Tokyo
1902 establishments in Japan
Women's universities and colleges in Japan
Sports universities and colleges
Kunitachi, Tokyo